Lautaro de Léon Billar (born 9 February 2001) is a Uruguayan professional footballer who plays as a forward for Spanish club Celta de Vigo B.

Club career
Born in Montevideo, de León moved to Spain at early age and joined Portonovo SD's youth setup at the age of four. On 3 July 2017, he moved to RC Celta de Vigo and was initially assigned to the Juvenil B squad.

De León made his senior debut with the reserves on 24 March 2019, coming on as a late substitute for Víctor Pastrana in a 1–3 Segunda División B away loss against Cultural y Deportiva Leonesa. He scored his first goal on 18 September, netting his team's fourth in a 4–2 home win against UD Melilla.

On 14 December 2020, de León made his first team – and La Liga – debut, replacing Nolito late into a 4–0 home routing of Cádiz CF.

International career
Born in Uruguay, de León can also represent Spain after living for more than ten years in the country.

Career statistics

Club

References

External links

2001 births
Living people
Footballers from Montevideo
Uruguayan footballers
Association football forwards
La Liga players
Primera Federación players
Segunda División B players
Celta de Vigo B players
RC Celta de Vigo players